Helston Athletic Football Club is a football club based in Helston, Cornwall, England.

History
The club was established in 1896. They joined the Cornwall Senior League after its formation in 1931 and won back-to-back league titles in 1936–37 and 1937–38. After finishing as runners-up in 1938–39, the club were champions for a third time in 1939–40. In 1953 they joined the South Western League. The club finished bottom of the South Western League in 1970–71, and after finishing second-from-bottom the following season, left to join the Cornwall Combination.

Helston were Cornwall Combination champions in 1987–88 and again in 2000–01. After winning the league for a third time in 2010–11, the club were promoted to Division One West of the South West Peninsula League. They finished as runners-up in both of their first two seasons in the league, and after a third-place finish in 2013–14, won the division in 2014–15, earning promotion to the Premier Division. Following league reorganisation at the end of the 2018–19 season, the club were placed in the Premier Division West.

In 2021 Helston were promoted to the Premier Division of the Western League based on their results in the abandoned 2019–20 and 2020–21 seasons.

Ground
The club played at several grounds on Clodgey Lane before moving to Beacon Park in 1949, a ground which had been built by German POWs shortly after World War II. In 1972 they moved to their current ground, Kellaway Park, also on the same road. The ground initially consisted of a rented pitch, before a wooden shed was built that also served as the clubhouse. A new clubhouse was built in 1988 and included a roof overhang for spectator cover.

In 2015 a 100-seat stand and floodlights were installed, with the first match under lights played on 1 September 2015 against St Austell.

Honours
South West Peninsula League
Division One West champions 2014–15
Cornwall Combination
Champions 1987–88, 2000–01, 2010–11
Cornwall Senior League
Champions winners 1936–37, 1937–38, 1939–40
Cornwall Charity Cup
Winners 1937–38, 1960–61, 1962–62
Cornwall Junior Cup
Winners 2013–14

Records
Best FA Cup performance: Third qualifying round, 2022–23
Best FA Vase performance: First round, 2016–17

See also

Helston Athletic F.C. players
Helston Athletic F.C. managers

References

External links
Official website

 
Football clubs in England
Football clubs in Cornwall
Association football clubs established in 1896
1896 establishments in England
Helston
South Western Football League
Cornwall Combination
South West Peninsula League
Western Football League